Vítězslav Jureček (25 May 1960 – 18 May 2011) was a Czech biathlete. He competed in the 10 km sprint event at the 1984 Winter Olympics.

References

External links
 

1960 births
2011 deaths
Czech male biathletes
Olympic biathletes of Czechoslovakia
Biathletes at the 1984 Winter Olympics
People from Šumperk
Sportspeople from the Olomouc Region